The thirty New Caledonian languages form a branch of the Southern Oceanic languages. Their speakers are known as Kanaks. One language is extinct, one is critically endangered, 4 are severely endangered, 5 are endangered, and another 5 are vulnerable to extinction.

Typology
The Cèmuhî, Paicî, Drubea, Numèè, and Kwenyii languages are tonal.

Other than phonemically contrastive tone, typological features in New Caledonian languages that are typically unusual for Oceanic languages include nasalized vowels, very large vowel inventories, retroflex consonants, and voiceless nasals.

Languages 

Loyalty Islands
Drehu (Lifou Island)
Iaai (Ouvéa Island)
Nengone (Maré Island)
Mainland New Caledonian
Southern New Caledonian
Extreme Southern
Ndrumbea (vulnerable)
Numèè
Mid-Southern
Xârâcùù–Xârâgurè: 
Xârâcùù
Xârâgurè (endangered)
Zire–Tîrî: 
Tîrî (endangered)
Zire †
Wailic
Ajië
Arhâ (severely endangered)
Arhö (critically endangered)
Neku (severely endangered)
Orowe (endangered)
Northern New Caledonian
Haeke*
Haveke*
Vamale*
Central Northern
Cèmuhî
Paicî
North Northern
Pwaamei (endangered)
Pwapwa (severely endangered)
Bwatoo
Hmwaveke
Waamwang
Fwâi
Jawe (vulnerable)
Nemi (vulnerable)
Pije (severely endangered)
Extreme Northern
Caac (vulnerable)
Kumak (vulnerable) 
Nyâlayu
Yuanga

The languages of the northern Voh–Koné area (*) are often discussed as a unit.

List of New Caledonian languages

References 

 
 
Southern Oceanic languages